The Queen's Tower, also known as Quindah Tower) is a tower that was built by the Dutch during their rule in Sri Lanka. It is located on the southeastern coast of Neduntheevu, also known as Delft Island.

It was used as a lighthouse or navigation point by the Dutch and British. A fire was lit at the bottom which created a vacuum, forcing air upwards. Its light was passed through the tower's chimney-like tube to the top where sailors would be able to see the light from a distance. Another tower known as the "King's Tower" was operated during the period of British rule on Sri Lanka, then Ceylon. Only the basement of the King's Tower survives to this day.

References 

Neduntheevu
Tourist attractions in Northern Province, Sri Lanka
Archaeological protected monuments in Jaffna District
Buildings and structures in Jaffna District